M&T Bank Arena, previously known as TD Bank Sports Center and People's United Center, is a multi-purpose arena in Hamden, Connecticut.  Its design is unusual in that it consists of two separate playing and seating areas, one intended for basketball and one intended for ice hockey, joined together within a common facility.  It seats 3,570 for basketball and 3,386 for hockey. Officially, the hockey side is known as the Frank Perrotti, Jr. Arena at the People's United Center.

The center opened on January 27, 2007, and is home to the Quinnipiac University men's and women's basketball and men's and women's ice hockey teams.  It replaced Burt Kahn Court for the basketball team and the Northford Ice Pavilion for ice hockey.  It is located on Quinnipiac's York Hill Campus and is part of a large expansion project for that campus.

The center cost $52 million to build. Its creation is part of an ambitious plan by Quinnipiac to improve its drawing power for student athletes.

Events
 2014 NCAA D1 Women's Frozen Four
 2019 NCAA D1 Women's Frozen Four

See also
Enterprise Center (St. Louis, MO)
TD Ameritrade Park Omaha (Nebraska)
TD Arena (Charleston, South Carolina)
List of NCAA Division I basketball arenas

References

External links
Arena Factsheet

College basketball venues in the United States
College ice hockey venues in the United States
Basketball venues in Connecticut
Indoor ice hockey venues in the United States
Quinnipiac Bobcats
Sports venues in New Haven County, Connecticut
2007 establishments in Connecticut
Sports venues completed in 2007